Bloomfield Academy Center for Science and Technology, formerly known only as Bloomfield Academy, is a private school centered in the Philippines in Las Piñas. The school was founded in 1985 and started education services in the early 1986. The school currently has STEM curriculum introduced. The school is currently owned by Mr. and Mrs. Llarena of Dane Publishing Inc..

History 
In 1985, The school began operation with just a few classrooms and grade school service. Students are given their first Holy Communion and participates in other student events such as the Foundation Day.

In the early 90s up to the present, the school was subject to a dramatic renovation project which added many new classrooms and facilities, adding more classrooms as the time goes on. The school experienced a dramatic increase in students, which continues until today. The Singapore Science Method is adapted in the Grade School.

Facilities  
The school currently offers preschool, elementary, junior high school and senior high school. The school does not currently offer Special Education. The school has three comfort rooms, two multipurpose halls, a covered court, a S.T.E.M lab, a music room, a speech laboratory, a computer laboratory and others. The school is currently applying for PAASCU accreditation.

References

Catholic elementary schools in Metro Manila
Catholic secondary schools in Metro Manila
Schools in Las Piñas
Schools in Bacoor
1985 establishments in the Philippines
Educational institutions established in 1985